The four arrondissements of the Côtes-d'Armor department are:
 Arrondissement of Dinan, (subprefecture: Dinan) with 67 communes. The population of the arrondissement was 102,698 in 2016.  
 Arrondissement of Guingamp, (subprefecture: Guingamp) with 111 communes. The population of the arrondissement was 125,567 in 2016.  
 Arrondissement of Lannion, (subprefecture: Lannion) with 57 communes. The population of the arrondissement was 99,903 in 2016.  
 Arrondissement of Saint-Brieuc, (prefecture of the Côtes-d'Armor department: Saint-Brieuc) with 113 communes. The population of the arrondissement was 270,785 in 2016.

History

In 1800 the arrondissements of Saint-Brieuc, Dinan, Guingamp, Lannion and Loudéac were established. The arrondissement of Loudéac was disbanded in 1926.

The borders of the arrondissements of Côtes-d'Armor were modified in January 2017:
 25 communes from the arrondissement of Dinan to the arrondissement of Saint-Brieuc
 five communes from the arrondissement of Guingamp to the arrondissement of Saint-Brieuc
 29 communes from the arrondissement of Saint-Brieuc to the arrondissement of Guingamp

References

Cotes-d'Armor